Rabi ibn Ziyad al-Harithi was an Arab military leader, who served the Rashidun and Umayyad Caliphates.

Biography 
In 651, Rabi ibn Ziyad invaded the Sasanian province of Sakastan. After some time, he reached Zaliq, a border town between Kirman and Sakastan, where he forced the dehqan of the town to acknowledge Muslim authority. He then did the same at the fortress of Karkuya, which had a famous fire temple, which is mentioned in the Tarikh-i Sistan. He then continued to seize more land in the province. He thereafter besieged the capital Zrang, and after a heavy battle outside the city, its governor Aparviz surrendered. When Aparviz went to Rabi ibn Ziyad to discuss about the conditions of a treaty, he saw that he was using the bodies of two dead soldiers as a chair. This horrified Aparviz, who in order to spare the inhabitants of Sakastan from the Arabs, made peace with them in return for a heavy tribute of one million dirhams, as well as 1,000 slave boys (or girls) bearing 1,000 golden vessels. Rabi ibn Ziyad was then appointed as the governor of the province.

18 months later, Rabi was summoned to Basra, and was replaced by Abd al-Rahman ibn Samura as governor. In 671, Rabi was appointed as the governor of Khurasan, where he was able to expand Muslim rule in the east as far as Balkh. In 673, his son Abdallah ibn Rabi succeeded him as governor.

References

Sources 
 

 
 

7th-century deaths
7th-century Arabs
Arab generals
Generals of the Umayyad Caliphate
People of the Muslim conquest of Persia
Governors of Sistan
Umayyad governors of Khurasan